John Balderston may refer to:

 John L. Balderston (1889–1954), American playwright and screenwriter
 John Balderston (academic) (died 1719), vice-chancellor of the University of Cambridge